Megan Bozek (born March 27, 1991) is an American ice hockey player and member of the United States national team. She most recently played with the KRS Vanke Rays of the Zhenskaya Hockey League (ZhHL) during the 2020–21 season.

Bozek played her collegiate career with the Minnesota Golden Gophers women's ice hockey program. She was selected second overall by the Toronto Furies in the 2014 CWHL Draft and, over her career, has played in the Canadian Women's Hockey League (CWHL), National Women's Hockey League (NWHL), and the Zhenskaya Hockey League (ZhHL).

Playing career

NCAA
Bozek joined the Minnesota Golden Gophers in the autumn of 2009. By season's end, she tied for fifth on the team in scoring and second among defenders.

USA Hockey
During the 2007–08 season, Bozek was a member of the U.S. Under-22 Team. She logged two assists in the gold medal game of the 2009 IIHF World Women's U18 Championship.

On January 2, 2022, Bozek was named to Team USA's roster to represent the United States at the 2022 Winter Olympics.

Canadian Women's Hockey League (CWHL)
On August 19, 2014, Bozek was picked second overall in the 2014 CWHL Draft by the Toronto Furies.

She played with the Markham Thunder for the 2017–18 and 2018–19 CWHL seasons.

National Women's Hockey League (NWHL)
On September 25, 2015, Bozek signed with the Buffalo Beauts of the National Women's Hockey League (NWHL). Selected to participate in the inaugural NWHL All-Star Game, Bozek won the hardest shot competition. Bozek and the Beauts finished their inaugural season by playing for the inaugural Isobel Cup finals.

On July 31, 2016, Bozek re-signed with Buffalo, on a one-year contract for $22,500, making her the highest-paid player in the history of the Beauts. Playing for Team Kessel, Bozek scored a goal at the 2nd NWHL All-Star Game. Bozek scored a goal in the Isobel Cup Final against the Boston Pride, which the Beauts won by a final score of 3–2, making the Beauts the 2017 Isobel Cup Champions.

Career stats

NCAA

Minnesota

CWHL

Awards and honors
2010 Second Team All-WCHA
2010 WCHA All-Rookie Team
WCHA Defensive Player of the Week (Week of December 7, 2011)
2011 WCHA Tournament team
2011–12 CCM Hockey Women's Division I All-American, First Team
2011–12 Minnesota Golden Gophers Female Athlete of the Year
2012 NCAA All-Tournament team
NWHL Player of the Week, (Week of January 5, 2016)
NWHL Best Defender award for 2017

References

External links

Megan Bozek at Minnesota Gophers

Megan Bozek at USA Hockey

1991 births
Living people
American women's ice hockey defensemen
People from Buffalo Grove, Illinois
Ice hockey players from Illinois
Shenzhen KRS Vanke Rays players
Buffalo Beauts players
Toronto Furies players
Markham Thunder players
Minnesota Golden Gophers women's ice hockey players
American expatriate ice hockey players in China
American expatriate ice hockey players in Russia
American expatriate ice hockey players in Canada
American people of Slavic descent
Ice hockey players at the 2014 Winter Olympics
Ice hockey players at the 2022 Winter Olympics
Medalists at the 2014 Winter Olympics
Medalists at the 2022 Winter Olympics
Olympic silver medalists for the United States in ice hockey